The brown false shieldback (Aroegas fuscus) is a species of katydid that is only known from two localities; in Mpumalanga and in Limpopo provinces, South Africa. It only occurs at elevations above 1,200 m in the mesic highveld grasslands.

References

Tettigoniidae
Endemic insects of South Africa
Endangered animals
Insects described in 1996